Cẩm Lệ is an urban district of Da Nang in the South Central Coast region of Vietnam.

Administration
The district was established by Government Decree No. 102/2005/ND-CP on August 5, 2005.

The district includes six urban wards (phường):
Khuê Trung
Hòa Thọ Đông
Hòa Thọ Tây
Hòa An
Hòa Phát
Hòa Xuân

As of 2003 the district had a population of 71,429. The district covers an area of 33.3 km². The district capital lies at Hòa Thọ Đông ward.

References

Districts of Da Nang